Adrián Bertolini (born 9 August 1978) is an Uruguayan basketball player, currently playing for Cader in the Uruguayan second division. He plays as a point guard.

References

1978 births
Living people
Basketball players at the 1999 Pan American Games
Pan American Games competitors for Uruguay
Uruguayan men's basketball players
Uruguayan people of Italian descent
Point guards